Košice Staré Mesto (literally: "Košice Old Town") is a borough (city ward) of Košice, Slovakia. It encompasses the historical centre of the city, consisting of the medieval and early modern core of Košice, with many preserved historical buildings of several architectural styles, and a small number of more modern architecture. The borough also includes the immediate environs of the historical centre (e.g. Mestský park ("City Park"), Staničné námestie ("Station Square") with the main train station, etc.).

Statistics 
 Area: 
 Population: 20,751 (31 December 2017)
 Population density: 4,800/km² (31 December 2017)
 District: Košice I
 Mayor: Ing. Igor Petrovčik (as of 2018 elections)

Historical landmarks 

Churches and synagogues
St Elisabeth Cathedral (Main Street)
St Michael Chapel (Main Street)
Church of the Assumption of the Virgin Mary (Dominican Church)
St Anthony of Padua Church (Main Street)
Evangelical Church (Mlynská Street)
Calvinist Church (Hrnčiarska Street)
Cathedral of the Nativity of the Mother of God (Moyzesova Street)
 Orthodox Synagogue (Zvonárska Street)
New Orthodox Synagogue (Puškinova Street)

Old housing and public buildings 
 Levoča House (15th century townhouse and inn, Main Street)
 Mikluš Prison (late-medieval city houses converted into the old city prison)
 St. Urban Tower (medieval bell tower, Main Street)
 State Theatre Košice (Main Street)
 Captain Palace, headquarters of the Slovak Technical Museum (Main Street)
 Jakab Palace (Mlynská Street)
 St Charles Borromeo Seminary (Main Street)
 Craftsman's Lane historical housing and workshops (Hrnčiarska Street)

Memorials and monuments
 Plague Column, Košice (Main Street)

Fortifications 

 Lower Gate (Dolná brána) fortification complex (Main Street, exhibition)
 Executioner's Bastion (Stará baštová Street, exhibition)
 Ruins of city walls (Hrnčiarska Street, Mlynská Street, Hradbová Street, Čajkovskéko Street, et al.)
 Ruins of the Košice citadel fortress (Liberators' Square, publicly displayed)
 Ruins of the stone bridge on Elisabeth Street (publicly displayed)

Industrial heritage
 Late-medieval horse mill and early modern gunpowder storeroom (Zbrojničná Street) 
 Stará sladovňa, 19th century Old Town brewery (Štúr Street)
 Old tobacco factory Tabačka (Gorkého Street, converted into Tabačka Kulturfabrik art centre)

Museums and art galleries 
 East Slovak Museum (Marathon Runners' Square)
 Medieval Fortifications of the City of Košice (branch exhibition, Executioner's Bastion, Stará Baštová Street) 
 City history exhibition (branch exhibition, Mikluš Prison, Pri Miklušovej väznici Street) 
 The House of Crafts (branch exhibition, Hrnčiarska Street) 
 Historical art exhibition (branch exhibition, Hviezdoslavova Street) 
 Natural history exhibition (branch exhibition, Hviezdoslavova Street) 
 Slovak Technical Museum (Main Street)
 East Slovak Gallery (Main Street)
 Lower Gate (Dolná brána) Archaeological Exhibition (Main Street)
 Kunsthalle Košice - Art and exhibition centre.

Infrastructure 
 Košice railway station - Main railway station of the city, at Staničné námestie ("Station Square").

Gallery 

Main Street (Hlavná ulica) 

Other Old Town streets and squares 

Religious buildings and cemeteries

Museums and art galleries

Historical fortifications 

Newer buildings

Train station

See also 
 Old Town, Bratislava - An analogous borough in Slovakia's capital, Bratislava.

References

External links 

 Official website of the Košice Old Town borough
 Article on the Košice Old Town borough at Cassovia.sk
 Official website of Košice

Boroughs of Košice